Boris Bobrovnikov (born October 29, 1960) is a founder of the IT company CROC. He started studying at Moscow Geological Exploration Institute in 1977, graduated in 1982, and obtained a Ph.D. in geophysical engineering in 1985.

Career and public activities 

During his university studies, Boris worked in the academic department and later became a senior researcher of the Geological Institute’s Research Force. He occupied his position between 1986 and 1989, followed by a research position at the Oceanology Institute of the USSR Academy of Sciences from 1989 to 1990. Counting a part-time job in the academic department, Boris had over ten years of experience in geophysics. Three of those, according to him, were spent in a tent on annual expeditions, doing his instrument geophysics research. When he was a senior student, he became a captain of the University Alpine Skiing Team.

In 1990, in partnership with George Galperin, he became a founder and director of the Medicine, Culture and Sport Association, a network of 18 gyms in Moscow with up to 350 employees. The association operated in various fields, from unique medical and wellness services to exploration works abroad. Mainly in the new area of biomechanical stimulation.

In 1992, he founded CROC, an IT company that provides a comprehensive IT offering, including complex technological projects and managed B2B services.

On April 29, 2003, he introduced IT Leader, Russia’s first IT national industry award for organizations and CIOs who directly contributed to the promotion of innovative information technology in Russia.

Boris is doing some sports – kitesurfing, windsurfing, wakeboarding, diving, and heliskiing. He likes industrial music.

In late 2022, Boris Bobrovnikov resigned as CEO and sold all his shares to the company's top management.

References 

1960 births
Living people
Russian technology company founders